Dr. Raghabananda Nayak (28 August 1938 - 31 October 2016) was a writer in Oriya and was a lecturer for many years in some Indian Universities. He was a Kriya Yoga spiritual master of Lahiri Mahasaya, Swami Sri Yukteswar, Paramahansa Yogananda and Paramahansa Hariharananda's lineage.

Biography

Studies 
Dr. Nayak was born in Fatepur Village of district Bhadrak, Odisha, India. He obtained his master's degree in Oriya from Vishwa Bharati University, Shantiniketan, India. Later he got his D. Litt. from Utkal University, Odisha. He had been appointed first as a lecturer in Vishwa Bharati University in 1960. For many years he headed the Dept. of Oriya at Gangadhar Meher College (Autonomous) in Sambalpur, Odisha from which he retired in 1996.

Initiation into Kriya Yoga and Samadhi
He came in contact with Paramahansa Hariharananda in early 1964 and learnt Kriya Yoga (a particular type of yoga taught by him) from him in 1965. According to his own personal account he experienced the state of samadhi, the highest state of mind that yoga practitioners aspire as an ultimate goal, on the very day of his initiation.

Menninger Foundation 
The Menninger Foundation of Topeka, Kansas, USA, had the opportunity of taking him as a subject of study and analyze alpha waves in the state of meditation. The results of this study along with a video has also been shown in a documentary film named "Biofeedback: Yoga for the West". Subsequently, this study had appeared in a science book named "Beyond Biofeedback" by Dr. Elmer and Alice Green.

Hariharananda Kriyayoga Mission 
He was the President of the Hariharananda Kriya Yoga Mission, Gopalmal, Sambalpur, Odisha, India from 1992 to 2008. This was founded by his master Paramahansa Hariharananda in the year 1992. He learnt from him at Karar Ashram in Puri what Hariharananda considered to be the higher kriyas according to the kriya yoga tradition and was given the title of Acharya (teacher) in 1974. Since then he is initiating people interested in this type of yoga and preparing acharyas of the Kriya Yoga order, as well as writing several books in Oriya and English about yoga and spiritual matters. According to his own account in the year 1992 his spiritual master conferred him the title of Rajarshi. At present he is the President of Hariharananda Kriya Yoga Mission, Banabira. And he is guiding the seekers of Kriya Yoga at his home in Sambalpur regularly in the mornings and evenings.

References

Writers from Odisha
Kriya yogis
1938 births

2016 deaths